Coleophora lycii is a moth of the family Coleophoridae. It is found in Turkestan and Uzbekistan.

The larvae feed on Lycium ruthenicum. They create a leafy case, consisting of five or six pieces, the length of which is distinctly greater toward the front. The valve is two-sided. Larvae can be found from July to October and (after hibernation) from the end of April to May.

References

lycii
Moths described in 1972
Moths of Asia